This is a list of law enforcement agencies in the U.S. state of Texas.

According to the US Bureau of Justice Statistics' 2008 Census of State and Local Law Enforcement Agencies, the state had 1,913 law enforcement agencies, the most of any state. These agencies employed 59,219 sworn police officers, about 244 for each 100,000 residents.

Federal agencies 
There are over 150 federal law enforcement offices in Texas. including those for the Federal Bureau of Prisons, Bureau of Alcohol, Tobacco, Firearms and Explosives; Customs and Border Protection; Drug Enforcement Administration; Federal Bureau of Investigation; Immigration and Customs Enforcement; United States Secret Service; Naval Criminal Investigative Service, and U.S. Marshals. According to the Bureau of Justice Statistics, a federal law enforcement agency is "an organizational unit, or subunit, of the federal government with the principle (sic) functions of prevention, detection, and investigation of crime and the apprehension of alleged offenders."

State agencies 
Texas Alcoholic Beverage Commission
Texas Attorney General
Texas Comptroller - Criminal Investigation Division (State Police)
Texas Commission on Law Enforcement
Texas Department of Criminal Justice
Texas Department of Insurance
State Fire Marshal's Office
Fraud Unit
Texas Department of Public Safety
 Texas Highway Patrol
 Texas Ranger Division
 Texas Parks and Wildlife Department
Texas Racing Commission - State Police
Texas Juvenile Justice Department – Office of the Inspector General
 Texas and Southwestern Cattle Raisers Association Special Rangers
Texas State Board of Dental Examiners - Investigations Division

County sheriff agencies 

 Anderson County Sheriff's Office
 Andrews County Sheriff's Office
 Angelina County Sheriff's Office
 Aransas County Sheriff's Office
 Archer County Sheriff's Office
 Armstrong County Sheriff's Office
 Atascosa County Sheriff's Office
 Austin County Sheriff's Office
 Bailey County Sheriff's Office
 Bandera County Sheriff's Office
 Bastrop County Sheriff's Office
 Baylor County Sheriff's Office
 Bee County Sheriff's Office
 Bell County Sheriff's Office
 Bexar County Sheriff's Office
 Blanco County Sheriff's Office
 Borden County Sheriff's Office
 Bosque County Sheriff's Office
 Bowie County Sheriff's Office
 Brazoria County Sheriff's Office
 Brazos County Sheriff's Office 
 Brewster County Sheriff's Office
 Briscoe County Sheriff's Office
 Brooks County Sheriff's Office
 Brown County Sheriff's Office
 Burleson County Sheriff's Office
 Burnet County Sheriff's Office
 Caldwell County Sheriff's Office
 Calhoun County Sheriff's Office
 Callahan County Sheriff's Office
 Cameron County Sheriff's Office 
 Camp County Sheriff's Office
 Carson County Sheriff's Office
 Cass County Sheriff's Office
 Castro County Sheriff's Office
 Chambers County Sheriff's Office
 Cherokee County Sheriff's Office
 Childress County Sheriff's Office
 Clay County Sheriff's Office
 Cochran County Sheriff's Office
 Coke County Sheriff's Office
 Coleman County Sheriff's Office
 Collin County Sheriff's Office
 Collingsworth County Sheriff's Office
 Colorado County Sheriff's Office
 Comal County Sheriff's Office
 Comanche County Sheriff's Office
 Concho County Sheriff's Office
 Cooke County Sheriff's Office
 Coryell County Sheriff's Office
 Cottle County Sheriff's Office
 Crane County Sheriff's Office
 Crockett County Sheriff's Office
 Crosby County Sheriff's Office
 Culberson County Sheriff's Office
 Dallam County Sheriff's Office
 Dallas County Sheriff's Office
 Dawson County Sheriff's Office
 DeWitt County Sheriff's Office
 Deaf Smith County Sheriff's Office
 Delta County Sheriff's Office
 Denton County Sheriff's Office
 Dickens County Sheriff's Office
 Dimmit County Sheriff's Office
 Donley County Sheriff's Office
 Duval County Sheriff's Office
 Eastland County Sheriff's Office
 Ector County Sheriff's Office
 Edwards County Sheriff's Office
 El Paso County Sheriff's Office
 Ellis County Sheriff's Office
 Erath County Sheriff's Office
 Falls County Sheriff's Office
 Fannin County Sheriff's Office
 Fayette County Sheriff's Office
 Fisher County Sheriff's Office
 Floyd County Sheriff's Office
 Foard County Sheriff's Office
 Fort Bend County Sheriff's Office
 Franklin County Sheriff's Office
 Freestone County Sheriff's Office
 Frio County Sheriff's Office
 Gaines County Sheriff's Office
 Galveston County Sheriff's Office
 Garza County Sheriff's Office
 Gillespie County Sheriff's Office
 Glasscock County Sheriff's Office
 Goliad County Sheriff's Office
 Gonzales County Sheriff's Office
 Gray County Sheriff's Office
 Grayson County Sheriff's Office
 Gregg County Sheriff's Office
 Grimes County Sheriff's Office
 Guadalupe County Sheriff's Office
 Hale County Sheriff's Office
 Hall County Sheriff's Office
 Hamilton County Sheriff's Office
 Hansford County Sheriff's Office
 Hardeman County Sheriff's Office
 Hardin County Sheriff's Office
 Harris County Sheriff's Office
 Harrison County Sheriff's Office
 Hartley County Sheriff's Office
 Hays County Sheriff's Office
 Hemphill County Sheriff's Office
 Henderson County Sheriff's Office
 Hidalgo County Sheriff's Office
 Hill County Sheriff's Office
 Hockley County Sheriff's Office
 Hood County Sheriff's Office
 Hopkins County Sheriff's Office
 Houston County Sheriff's Office
 Howard County Sheriff's Office
 Hudspeth County Sheriff's Office
 Hunt County Sheriff's Office 
 Hutchinson County Sheriff's Office
 Irion County Sheriff's Office
 Jack County Sheriff's Office
 Jackson County Sheriff's Office
 Jasper County Sheriff's Office
 Jeff Davis County Sheriff's Office
 Jefferson County Sheriff's Office
 Jim Hogg County Sheriff's Office
 Jim Wells County Sheriff's Office
 Johnson County Sheriff's Office
 Jones County Sheriff's Office
 Karnes County Sheriff's Office
 Kaufman County Sheriff's Office
 Kendall County Sheriff's Office
 Kenedy County Sheriff's Office
 Kent County Sheriff's Office
 Kerr County Sheriff's Office
 Kimble County Sheriff's Office
 King County Sheriff's Office
 Kinney County Sheriff's Office
 Kleberg County Sheriff's Office
 Knox County Sheriff's Office
 La Salle County Sheriff's Office
 Lamar County Sheriff's Office
 Lamb County Sheriff's Office
 Lampasas County Sheriff's Office
 Lavaca County Sheriff's Office
 Lee County Sheriff's Office
 Leon County Sheriff's Office
 Liberty County Sheriff's Office
 Limestone County Sheriff's Office
 Lipscomb County Sheriff's Office
 Live Oak County Sheriff's Office
 Llano County Sheriff's Office
 Loving County Sheriff's Office
 Lubbock County Sheriff's Office
 Lynn County Sheriff's Office
 Madison County Sheriff's Office
 Marion County Sheriff's Office
 Martin County Sheriff's Office
 Mason County Sheriff's Office
 Matagorda County Sheriff's Office
 Maverick County Sheriff's Office
 McCulloch County Sheriff's Office
 McLennan County Sheriff's Office
 McMullen County Sheriff's Office
 Medina County Sheriff's Office
 Menard County Sheriff's Office
 Midland County Sheriff's Office
 Milam County Sheriff's Office
 Mills County Sheriff's Office
 Mitchell County Sheriff's Office
 Montague County Sheriff's Office
 Montgomery County Sheriff's Office
 Moore County Sheriff's Office
 Morris County Sheriff's Office
 Motley County Sheriff's Office
 Nacogdoches County Sheriff's Office
 Navarro County Sheriff's Office
 Newton County Sheriff's Office
 Nolan County Sheriff's Office
 Nueces County Sheriff's Office
 Ochiltree County Sheriff's Office
 Oldham County Sheriff's Office
 Orange County Sheriff's Office
 Palo Pinto County Sheriff's Office
 Panola County Sheriff's Office
 Parker County Sheriff's Office
 Parmer County Sheriff's Office
 Pecos County Sheriff's Office
 Polk County Sheriff's Office
 Potter County Sheriff's Office
 Presidio County Sheriff's Office
 Rains County Sheriff's Office
 Randall County Sheriff's Office
 Reagan County Sheriff's Office
 Real County Sheriff's Office
 Red River County Sheriff's Office
 Reeves County Sheriff's Office
 Refugio County Sheriff's Office
 Roberts County Sheriff's Office
 Robertson County Sheriff's Office
 Rockwall County Sheriff's Office
 Runnels County Sheriff's Office
 Rusk County Sheriff's Office
 Sabine County Sheriff's Office
 San Augustine County Sheriff's Office
 San Jacinto County Sheriff's Office
 San Patricio County Sheriff's Office 
 San Saba County Sheriff's Office
 Schleicher County Sheriff's Office
 Scurry County Sheriff's Office
 Shackelford County Sheriff's Office
 Shelby County Sheriff's Office
 Sherman County Sheriff's Office
 Smith County Sheriff's Office
 Somervell County Sheriff's Office
 Starr County Sheriff's Office
 Stephens County Sheriff's Office
 Sterling County Sheriff's Office
 Stonewall County Sheriff's Office
 Sutton County Sheriff's Office
 Swisher County Sheriff's Office
 Tarrant County Sheriff's Office
 Taylor County Sheriff's Office
 Terrell County Sheriff's Office
 Terry County Sheriff's Office
 Throckmorton County Sheriff's Office
 Titus County Sheriff's Office
 Tom Green County Sheriff's Office
 Travis County Sheriff's Office
 Trinity County Sheriff's Office
 Tyler County Sheriff's Office
 Upshur County Sheriff's Office
 Upton County Sheriff's Office
 Uvalde County Sheriff's Office
 Val Verde County Sheriff's Office
 Van Zandt County Sheriff's Office
 Victoria County Sheriff's Office
 Walker County Sheriff's Office
 Waller County Sheriff's Office 
 Ward County Sheriff's Office
 Washington County Sheriff's Office
 Webb County Sheriff's Office
 Wharton County Sheriff's Office
 Wheeler County Sheriff's Office
 Wichita County Sheriff's Office
 Wilbarger County Sheriff's Office
 Willacy County Sheriff's Office
 Williamson County Sheriff's Office
 Wilson County Sheriff's Office
 Winkler County Sheriff's Office
 Wise County Sheriff's Office
 Wood County Sheriff's Office
 Yoakum County Sheriff's Office
 Young County Sheriff's Office
 Zapata County Sheriff's Office
 Zavala County Sheriff's Office

County constable agencies 

 Anderson County Constable’s Office
 Andrews County Constable’s Office
 Angelina County Constable’s Office
 Aransas County Constable’s Office
 Archer County Constable’s Office
 Armstrong County Constable’s Office
 Atascosa County Constable’s Office
 Austin County Constable’s Office
 Bailey County Constable’s Office
 Bandera County Constable’s Office
 Bastrop County Constable’s Office
 Baylor County Constable’s Office
 Bee County Constable’s Office
 Bell County Constable’s Office
 Bexar County Constable’s Office
 Blanco County Constable’s Office
 Borden County Constable’s Office
 Bosque County Constable’s Office
 Bowie County Constable’s Office
 Brazoria County Constable’s Office
 Brazos County Constable’s Office
 Brewster County Constable’s Office
 Briscoe County Constable’s Office
 Brooks County Constable’s Office
 Brown County Constable’s Office
 Burleson County Constable’s Office
 Burnet County Constable’s Office
 Caldwell County Constable’s Office
 Calhoun County Constable’s Office
 Callahan County Constable’s Office
 Cameron County Constable’s Office
 Camp County Constable’s Office
 Carson County Constable’s Office
 Cass County Constable’s Office
 Castro County Constable’s Office
 Chambers County Constable’s Office
 Cherokee County Constable’s Office
 Childress County Constable’s Office
 Clay County Constable’s Office
 Cochran County Constable’s Office
 Coke County Constable’s Office
 Coleman County Constable’s Office
 Collin County Constable’s Office
 Collingsworth County Constable’s Office
 Colorado County Constable’s Office
 Comal County Constable’s Office
 Comanche County Constable’s Office
 Concho County Constable’s Office
 Cooke County Constable’s Office
 Coryell County Constable’s Office
 Cottle County Constable’s Office
 Crane County Constable’s Office
 Crockett County Constable’s Office
 Crosby County Constable’s Office
 Culberson County Constable’s Office
 Dallam County Constable’s Office
 Dallas County Constable’s Office
 Dawson County Constable’s Office
 DeWitt County Constable’s Office
 Deaf Smith County Constable’s Office
 Delta County Constable’s Office
 Denton County Constable’s Office
 Dickens County Constable’s Office
 Dimmit County Constable’s Office
 Donley County Constable’s Office
 Duval County Constable’s Office
 Eastland County Constable’s Office
 Ector County Constable’s Office
 Edwards County Constable’s Office
 El Paso County Constable’s Office
 Ellis County Constable’s Office
 Erath County Constable’s Office
 Falls County Constable’s Office
 Fannin County Constable’s Office
 Fayette County Constable’s Office
 Fisher County Constable’s Office
 Floyd County Constable’s Office
 Foard County Constable’s Office
 Fort Bend County Constable’s Office
 Franklin County Constable’s Office
 Freestone County Constable’s Office
 Frio County Constable’s Office
 Gaines County Constable’s Office
 Galveston County Constable’s Office
 Garza County Constable’s Office
 Gillespie County Constable’s Office
 Glasscock County Constable’s Office
 Goliad County Constable’s Office
 Gonzales County Constable’s Office
 Gray County Constable’s Office
 Grayson County Constable’s Office
 Gregg County Constable’s Office
 Grimes County Constable’s Office
 Guadalupe County Constable’s Office
 Hale County Constable’s Office
 Hall County Constable’s Office
 Hamilton County Constable’s Office
 Hansford County Constable’s Office
 Hardeman County Constable’s Office
 Hardin County Constable’s Office
 Harris County Constable’s Office
 Harrison County Constable’s Office
 Hartley County Constable’s Office
 Haskell County Constable’s Office
 Hays County Constable’s Office
 Hemphill County Constable’s Office
 Henderson County Constable’s Office
 Hidalgo County Constable’s Office
 Hill County Constable’s Office
 Hockley County Constable’s Office
 Hood County Constable’s Office
 Hopkins County Constable’s Office
 Houston County Constable’s Office
 Howard County Constable’s Office
 Hudspeth County Constable’s Office
 Hunt County Constable’s Office
 Huntchinson County Constable’s Office
 Irion County Constable’s Office
 Jack County Constable’s Office
 Jackson County Constable’s Office
 Jasper County Constable’s Office
 Jeff Davis County Constable’s Office
 Jefferson County Constable’s Office
 Jim Hogg County Constable’s Office
 Jim Wells County Constable’s Office
 Johnson County Constable’s Office
 Jones County Constable’s Office
 Karnes County Constable’s Office
 Kaufman County Constable’s Office
 Kendall County Constable’s Office
 Kenedy County Constable’s Office
 Kent County Constable’s Office
 Kerr County Constable’s Office
 Kimble County Constable’s Office
 King County Constable’s Office
 Kinney County Constable’s Office
 Kleberg County Constable’s Office
 Knox County Constable’s Office
 La Salle County Constable’s Office
 Lamar County Constable’s Office
 Lamb County Constable’s Office
 Lampasas County Constable’s Office
 Lavaca County Constable’s Office
 Lee County Constable’s Office
 Leon County Constable’s Office
 Liberty County Constable’s Office
 Limestone County Constable’s Office
 Lipscomb County County Sheriff’s Office
 Live Oak County Constable’s Office
 Llano County Constable’s Office
 Loving County Constable’s Office
 Lubbock County Constable’s Office
 Lynn County Constable’s Office
 Madison County Constable’s Office
 Marion County Constable’s Office
 Martin County Constable’s Office
 Mason County Constable’s Office
 Matagorda County Constable’s Office
 Maverick County Constable’s Office
 McCulloch County Constable’s Office
 McLennan County Constable’s Office
 McMullen County Constable’s Office
 Medina County Constable’s Office
 Menard County Constable’s Office
 Midland County Constable’s Office
 Milam County Constable’s Office
 Mills County Constable’s Office
 Mitchell County Constable’s Office
 Montague County Constable’s Office
 Montgomery County Constable’s Office
 Moore County Constable’s Office
 Morris County Constable’s Office
 Motley County Constable’s Office
 Nacogdoches County Constable’s Office
 Navarro County Constable’s Office
 Newton County Constable’s Office
 Nolan County Constable’s Office
 Nueces County Constable’s Office
 Ochiltree County Constable’s Office
 Oldham County Constable’s Office
 Orange County Constable’s Office
 Palo Pinto County Constable’s Office
 Panola County Constable’s Office
 Parker County Constable’s Office
 Parmer County Constable’s Office
 Pecos County Constable’s Office
 Polk County Constable’s Office
 Potter County Constable’s Office
 Presidio County Constable’s Office
 Rains County Constable’s Office
 Randall County Constable’s Office
 Reagan County Constable’s Office
 Real County Constable’s Office
 Red River County Constable’s Office
 Reeves County Constable’s Office
 Refugio County Constable’s Office
 Roberts County Constable’s Office
 Robertson County Constable’s Office
 Rockwall County Constable’s Office
 Runnels County Constable’s Office
 Rusk County Constable’s Office
 Sabine County Constable’s Office
 San Augustine County Constable’s Office
 San Jacinto County Constable’s Office
 San Patricio County Constable’s Office
 San Saba County Constable’s Office
 Schleicher County Constable’s Office
 Scurry County Constable’s Office
 Shakelford County Constable’s Office
 Shelby County Constable’s Office
 Sherman County Constable’s Office
 Smith County Constable’s Office
 Somerville County Constable’s Office
 Starr County Constable’s Office
 Stephens County Constable’s Office
 Sterling County Constable’s Office
 Stonewall County Constable’s Office
 Sutton County Constable’s Office
 Swisher County Constable’s Office
 Tarrant County Constable’s Office
 Taylor County Constable’s Office
 Terrell County Constable’s Office
 Terry County Constable’s Office
 Throckmorton County Constable’s Office
 Titus County Constable’s Office
 Tom Green County Constable’s Office
 Travis County Constable’s Office
 Trinity County Constable’s Office
 Tyler County Constable’s Office
 Upshur County Constable’s Office
 Upton County Constable’s Office
 Uvalde County Constable’s Office
 Val Verde County Constable’s Office
 Van Zandt County Constable’s Office
 Victoria County Constable’s Office
 Walker County Constable’s Office
 Waller County Constable’s Office
 Ward County Constable’s Office
 Washington County Constable’s Office
 Webb County Constable’s Office
 Wharton County Constable’s Office
 Wheeler County Constable’s Office
 Wichita County Constable’s Office
 Willbarger County Constable’s Office
 Willacy County Constable’s Office
 Williamson County Constable’s Office
 Wilson County Constable’s Office
 Winkler County Constable’s Office
 Wise County Constable’s Office
 Wood County Constable’s Office
 Yoakum County Constable’s Office
 Young County Constable’s Office
 Zapata County Constable’s Office
 Zavala County Constable’s Office

City agencies 

 Abernathy Police Department
 Abilene Police Department
 Addison Police Department
 Alamo Police Department
 Alamo Heights Police Department
 Albany Police Department
 Alice Police Department
 Allen Police Department
 Alpine Police Department
 Alto Police Department 
 Alton Police Department 
 Alvarado Police Department 
 Alvin Police Department 
 Amarillo Police Department 
 Andrews Police Department 
 Angleton Police Department 
 Anson Police Department 
 Anthony Police Department
 Aransas Pass Police Department
 Arcola Police Department 
 Arlington Police Department (Texas) 
 Athens Police Department 
 Atlanta Police Department (Texas) 
 Aubrey Police Department
 Austin Police Department
 Azle Police Department
 Balch Springs Police Department
 Balcones Heights Police Department
 Ballinger Police Department
 Bandera Police Department
 Bangs Police Department
 Bardwell Police Department
 Bartlett Police Department
 Bastrop Police Department
 Bay City Police Department (Texas) 
 Bayou Vista Police Department
 Baytown Police Department (Texas) 
 Beaumont Police Department 
 Bedford Police Department (Texas) 
 Bellaire Police Department
 Bellmead Police Department
 Bellville Police Department
 Belton Police Department
 Benbrook Police Department
 Bertram Police Department
 Beverly Hills Police Department (Texas) 
 Big Sandy Police Department
 Big Spring Police Department
 Bishop Police Department
 Blanco Police Department
 Blue Mound Police Department
 Boerne Police Department
 Bogata Police Department
 Bonham Police Department
 Borger Police Department
 Bovina Police Department
 Bowie Police Department (Texas) 
 Boyd Police Department
 Brady Police Department
 Brazoria Police Department
 Breckenridge Police Department
 Bremond Police Department
 Brenham Police Department
 Briaroaks Police Department
 Bridge City Police Department
 Bridgeport Police Department (Texas) 
 Brookshire Police Department
 Brownfield Police Department
 Brownsboro Police Department
 Brownsville Police Department
 Brownwood Police Department
 Bryan Police Department (Texas) 
 Buda Police Department
 Buffalo Police Department (Texas) 
 Bulverde Police Department
 Burkburnett Police Department
 Burleson Police Department
 Burnet Police Department
 Cactus Police Department
 Caddo Mills Police Department
 Caldwell Police Department
 Calvert Police Department 
 Cameron Police Department
 Camp Wood Police Department
 Caney City Police Department
 Canton Police Department
 Canyon Police Department
 Carrollton Police Department
 Carthage Police Department
 Castle Hills Police Department
 Castroville Police Department
 Cedar Hill Police Department
 Cedar Park Police Department
 Celeste Police Department
 Celina Police Department
 Center Police Department
 Chandler Police Department
 Childress Police Department
 Chillicothe Police Department
 China Grove Police Department
 Cibolo Police Department
 Cisco Police Department
 Clarksville Police Department
 Cleburne Police Department 
 Cleveland Police Department (Texas) 
 Clifton Police Department
 Clint Police Department
 Clute Police Department
 Clyde Police Department
 Cockrell Hill Police Department
 Coffee City Police Department
 Coleman Police Department
 College Station Police Department 
 Colleyville Police Department
 Colorado City Police Department (Texas) 
 Columbus Police Department
 Comanche Police Department
 Combine Police Department
 Commerce Police Department
 Como Police Department
 Conroe Police Department
 Converse Police Department
 Coppell Police Department
 Copperas Cove Police Department
 Corinth Police Department 
 Corpus Christi Police Department 
 Corrigan Police Department 
 Corsicana Police Department
 Crandall Police Department
 Crane Police Department
 Crockett Police Department
 Crosbyton Police Department
 Cross Plains Police Department
 Crowley Police Department
 Crystal City Police Department
 Cuero Police Department
 Cuney Police Department
 Daingerfield Police Department
 Daisetta Police Department
 Dalhart Police Department
 Dallas Police Department
 Dalworthington Gardens Department of Public Safety
 Danbury Police Department
 Dayton Police Department
 De Kalb Police Department
 De Leon Police Department
 DeSoto Police Department
 Decatur Police Department
 Deer Park Police Department
 Del Rio Police Department
 Denison Police Department
 Denton Police Department
 Denver City Police Department
 Devine Police Department
 Diboll Police Department
 Dickinson Police Department
 Dilley Police Department 
 Dimmitt Police Department 
 Donna Police Department 
 Double Oak Police Department 
 Driscoll Police Department
 Dublin Police Department
 Dumas Police Department
 Duncanville Police Department
 Eagle Lake Police Department
 Eagle Pass Police Department
 Early Police Department
 Earth Police Department 
 East Mountain Police Department
 East Tawakoni Police Department
 Eastland Police Department
 Edcouch Police Department
 Edgewood Police Department
 Edinburg Police Department
 Edna Police Department
 El Campo Police Department
 El Paso Police Department
 Electra Police Department
 Elgin Police Department
 Elmendorf Police Department
 Elsa Police Department
 Ennis Police Department
 Estelline Police Department
 Euless Police Department
 Eustace Police Department
 Everman Police Department
 Fair Oaks Ranch Police Department
 Fairfield Police Department
 Falfurrias Police Department
 Farmers Branch Police Department
 Farmersville Police Department
 Farwell Police Department
 Ferris Police Department
 Flatonia Police Department
 Florence Police Department
 Floresville Police Department
 Flower Mound Police Department
 Floydada Police Department
 Forest Hill Police Department
 Forney Police Department
 Fort Stockton Police Department
 Fort Worth Police Department
 Franklin Police Department 
 Frankston Police Department
 Fredericksburg Police Department
Freeport Police Department
 Freer Police Department
 Friendswood Police Department
 Friona Police Department
 Frisco Police Department
 Fritch Police Department
 Frost Police Department
 Gainesville Police Department
 Galena Park Police Department
 Galveston Police Department
 Ganado Police Department
 Garden Ridge Police Department
 Garland Police Department
 Garrett Police Department
 Gatesville Police Department
 George West Police Department
 Georgetown Police Department
 Giddings Police Department
 Gilmer Police Department
 Gladewater Police Department
 Glenn Heights Police Department
 Godley Police Department
 Gonzales Police Department
 Gorman Police Department
 Graham Police Department
 Granbury Police Department
 Grand Prairie Police Department
 Grand Saline Police Department
 Grandview Police Department
 Granger Police Department
 Granite Shoals Police Department
 Grapevine Police Department
 Greenville Police Department
 Gregory Police Department
 Grey Forrest Police Department
 Groesbeck Police Department
 Groves Police Department
 Groveton Police Department
 Gun Barrel City Police Department
 Gunter Police Department
 Hale Center Police Department
 Hallettsville Police Department
 Hallsville Police Department
 Haltom City Police Department
 Hamlin Police Department
 Harker Heights Police Department
 Harlingen Police Department
 Hart Police Department
 Haskell Police Department
 Hawk Cove Police Department
 Hawkins Police Department
 Hawley Police Department
 Hearne Police Department
 Hedwig Village Police Department
 Helotes Police Department
 Hemphill Police Department
 Hempstead Police Department
 Henderson Police Department
 Hereford Police Department
 Hewitt Police Department
 Hickory Creek Police Department
 Hico Police Department 
 Hidalgo Police Department
 Highland Village Police Department
 Hill Country Village Police Department
 Hillsboro Police Department
 Hitchcock Police Department 
 Holland Police Department
 Holliday Police Department
 Hollywood Park Police Department
 Hondo Police Department
 Honey Grove Police Department 
 Hooks Police Department
 Horizon City Police Department
 Houston Police Department 
 Howe Police Department
 Hubbard Police Department 
 Hudson Police Department
 Hudson Oaks Police Department
 Hughes Springs Police Department
 Humble Police Department
 Huntsville Police Department
 Hurst Police Department
 Hutchins Police Department
 Hutto Police Department
 Idalou Police Department
 Ingleside Police Department
 Ingram Police Departmet 
 Iowa Park Police Department
 Irving Police Department
 Italy Police Department
 Itasca Police Department
 Jacinto City Police Department
 Jacksboro Police Department
 Jacksonville Police Department
 Jamaica Beach Police Department
 Jarrel Police Department
 Jasper Police Department
 Jefferson Police Department 
 Jersey Village Police Department 
 Jewett Police Department
 Johnson City Police Department 
 Jonestown Police Department
 Josephine Police Department
 Joshua Police Department
 Jourdanton Police Department
 Junction Police Department
 Justin Police Department
 Karnes City Police Department
 Katy Police Department
 Kaufman Police Department
 Keene Police Department
 Keller Police Department
 Kemah Police Department
 Kemp Police Department
 Kempner Police Department
 Kenedy Police Department
 Kennedale Police Department
 Kerens Police Department
 Kermit Police Department
 Kerrville Police Department
 Kilgore Police Department
 Killeen Police Department 
 Kingsville Police Department
 Kirby Police Department 
 Kirbyville Police Department
 Knox City Police Department
 Kountze Police Department
 Krugerville Police Department
 Krum Police Department
 Kyle Police Department
 La Coste Police Department
 La Feria Police Department
 La Grange Police Department
 La Grulla Police Department
 La Marque Police Department
 La Porte Police Department
 Lacy-Lakeview Police Department
 Lago Vista Police Department
 Laguna Vista Police Department
 Lake Dallas Police Department
 Lake Jackson Police Department
 Lake Worth Police Department
 Lakeway Police Department
 Lamesa Police Department
 Lampasas Police Department
 Lancaster Police Department
 Laredo Police Department
 League City Police Department
 Leander Police Department
 Leon Valley Police Department
 Leonard Police Department
 Levelland Police Department
 Lewisville Police Department
 Lexington Police Department
 Liberty Police Department
 Liberty Hill Police Department
 Lindale Police Department
 Linden Police Department
 Little Elm Police Department
 Little River-Academy Police Department
 Littlefield Police Department
 Live Oak Police Department
 Liverpool Police Department
 Livingston Police Department 
 Llano Police Department
 Lockhart Police Department
 Lockney Police Department
 Log Cabin Police Department
 Lometa Police Department
 Lone Oak Police Department
 Lone Star Police Department
 Longview Police Department 
 Loraine Police Department
 Lorena Police Department
 Lorenzo Police Department 
 Los Fresnos Police Department
 Lott Police Department
 Lubbock Police Department 
 Lufkin Police Department 
 Luling Police Department
 Lumberton Police Department
 Lytle Police Department 
 Mabank Police Department 
 Madisonville Police Department
 Malakoff Police Department
 Mansfield Police Department 
 Manvel Police Department 
 Marble Falls Police Department
 Marfa Police Department
 Marion Police Department
 Marlin Police Department
 Marshall Police Department 
 Marshall Creek Police Department
 Mathis Police Department
 Maypearl Police Department
 McAllen Police Department
 McGregor Police Department
 McKinney Police Department
 Meadows Place Police Department
Melissa Police Department
 Memphis Police Department
 Mercedes Police Department
 Meridian Police Department
 Merkel Police Department
 Mesquite Police Department
 Mexia Police Department
 Midland Police Department
 Midlothian Police Department
 Miles Police Department
 Milford Police Department
 Mineola Police Department
 Mission Police Department
 Missouri City Police Department 
 Monahans Police Department
 Mont Belvieu Police Department 
 Moody Police Department
 Moulton Police Department
 Mount Pleasant Police Department 
 Mount Vernon Police Department
 Muleshoe Police Department
 Munday Police Department
 Murphy Police Department
 Mustang Ridge Police Department
 Nacogdoches Police Department 
 Naples Police Department
 Nash Police Department
 Nassau Bay Police Department 
 Natalia Police Department 
 Navasota Police Department
 Nederland Police Department
 Needville Police Department
 New Boston Police Department
 New Braunfels Police Department
 New Summerfield Police Department
 Newton Police Department
 Nocona Police Department
 Nolanville Police Department
 North Richland Hills Police Department
 Northlake Police Department
 Oak Point Police Department
 Oak Ridge North Police Department
 Oakwood Police Department
 Odessa Police Department
 O'Donnell Police Department
 Olmos Park Police Department
 Olney Police Department
 Olton Police Department
 Omaha Police Department
 Orange Police Department
 Ore City Police Department
 Overton Police Department
 Ovilla Police Department
 Oyster Creek Police Department
 Palacios Police Department
 Palestine Police Department
 Palmer Police Department
 Palmhurst Police Department
 Palmview Police Department
 Pampa Police Department
 Panhandle Police Department
 Panorama Police Department
 Paris City Police Department
 Parker Police Department
 Pasadena Police Department
 Patton Village Police Department
 Pearland Police Department
 Pearsall Police Department
 Pecos Police Department
 Pelican Bay Police Department
 Perryton Police Department
 Petersburg Police Department
 Pflugerville Police Department
 Pharr Police Department
 Pilot Point Police Department
 Pine Forest Police Department
 Pineland Police Department
 Pittsburg Police Department
 Plainview Police Department
 Plano Police Department
 Pleasanton Police Department
 Point Comfort Police Department
 Port Aransas Police Department
 Port Arthur Police Department 
 Port Isabel Police Department
 Port Lavaca Police Department
 Port Neches Police Department 
 Portland Police Department 
 Poteet Police Department
 Poth Police Department
 Prairie View Police Department
 Premont Police Department
 Presidio Police Department
 Princeton Police Department
Progreso Police Department
 Prosper Police Department
 Quitman Police Department
 Ralls Police Department
 Ranger Police Department
 Ransom Canyon Police Department
 Raymondville Police Department
 Red Oak Police Department
 Refugio Police Department
 Recklaw Police Department
 Reno Police Department
 Rhome Police Department
 Richardson Police Department 
 Richland Hills Police Department 
 Richmond Police Department
 Richwood Police Department
 Riesel Police Department
 Rio Grande City Police Department
 Rio Hondo Police Department
 Rising Star Police Department
 River Oaks Police Department
 Roanoke Police Department
 Robinson Police Department
 Robstown Police Department
 Rockdale Police Department
 Rockport Police Department
 Rockwall Police Department
 Rogers Police Department
 Rollingwood Police Department
 Roma Police Department
 Ropesvile Police Department
 Roscoe Police Department
 Rose Hill Acres Police Department
 Rosebud Police Department
 Rosenburg Police Department
 Round Rock Police Department
 Rowlett Police Department
 Royse City Police Department
 Rule Police Department
 Rusk Police Department
 Sabinal Police Department
 Sasche Police Department
 Saginaw Police Department
 Saint Jo Police Department
 San Angelo Police Department 
 San Antonio Police Department
 San Augustine Police Department
 San Benito Police Department
 San Diego Police Department 
 San Juan Police Department
 San Marcos Police Department
 San Saba Police Department
 Sanger Police Department
 Sansom Park Police Department
 Santa Anna Police Department
 Santa Fe Police Department
 Santa Rosa Police Department
 Savoy Police Department
 Schertz Police Department
 Schulenburg Police Department
 Seabrook Police Department
 Seadrift Police Department
 Seagoville Police Department
 Seagraves Police Department
 Sealy Police Department
 Seguin Police Department
 Selma Police Department
 Seminole Police Department
 Seven Points Police Department
 Seymour Police Department
 Shallowater Police Department
 Shamrock Police Department 
 Shavano Park Police Department
 Shenandoah Police Department
 Sherman Police Department 
 Shiner Police Department
 Shorearces Police Department
 Silsbee Police Department
 Sinton Police Department
 Slaton Police Department
 Smithville Police Department
 Snyder Police Department 
 Socorro Police Department
 Somerset Police Department
 Somerville Police Department
 Sonora Police Department
 Sour Lake Police Department
 South Houston Police Department
 South Padre Island Police Department
 Southlake Department of Public Safety
 Southmayd Police Department
 Southside Place Police Department
 Spearman Police Department
 Splendora Police Department
 Spring Valley Police Department
 Springtown Police Department
 Spur Police Department
 Stafford Police Department
 Stamford Police Department
 Stanton Police Department
 Stephenville Police Department
 Stinnett Police Department
 Stratford Police Department
 Sudan Police Department
 Sugar Land Police Department
 Sulphur Springs Police Department
 Sundown Police Department
 Sunray Police Department
 Sunset Valley Police Department
 Sweeny Police Department
 Sweetwater Police Department
 Taft Police Department
 Tahoka Police Department
 Talty Police Department
 Tatum Police Department
 Taylor Police Department
 Teague Police Department
 Temple Police Department 
 Terrell Police Department
 Texarkana Police Department
 Texas City Police Department
 The Colony Police Department
 Thorndale Police Department
 Thrall Police Department
 Three Rivers Police Department
 Tiki Island Police Department
 Tioga Police Department
 Tolar Police Department
 Tom Bean Police Department
 Tomball Police Department
 Trinity Police Department
 Trophy Club Police Department
 Troup Police Department
 Troy Police Department
 Tulia Police Department
 Tye Police Department
 Tyler Police Department
 Universal City Police Department 
 Uvalde Police Department
 Valley Mills Police Department
 Van Police Department
 Van Alstyne Police Department 
 Venus Police Department
 Vernon Police Department
Victoria Police Department
 Vidor Police Department 
 Von Ormy Police Department 
 Waco Police Department 
 Waedler Police Department
 Wake Village Police Department
Waller Police Department
 Wallis Police Department
 Watauga Police Department
 Waxahachie Police Department
 Weatherford Police Department
 Webster Police Department 
 Weimar Police Department
 Wells Police Department
 Weslaco Police Department
 West Police Department
 West Columbia Police Department
 West Lake Hills Police Department
 West Orange Police Department
 West Tawakoni Police Department
 West University Place Police Department 
 Westover Hills Police Department
 Westworth Village Police Department
 Wharton City Police Department
 White Oak Police Department
 White Settlement Police Department 
 Whitehouse Police Department
 Whitesboro Police Department
 Whitewright Police Department
 Whitney Police Department
 Wichita Falls Police Depaertment
 Willis Police Department
 Willow Park Police Department
 Wills Point Police Department 
 Wilmer Police Department
 Windcrest Police Department 
 Winfield Police Department
 Wink Police Department
 Winnsboro Police Department
 Winters Police Department
 Wolfe City Police Department
 Wolfforth Police Department
 Woodsboro Police Department
 Woodville Police Department
 Woodway Police Department
 Wortham Police Department
 Wylie Police Department 
 Yoakum Police Department
 Yorktown Police Department

College and university agencies 

 Abilene Christian University Police Department 
 Alamo Colleges Police Department 
 Alvin Community College Police Department 
 Amarillo College Police Department 
 Angelo State University Police Department 
 Austin Community College Police Department
 Baylor University Police Department
 Blinn College Police & Security Department
 Central Texas College Police Department
 College of the Mainland Police Department
 Collin College Police Department
 Concordia University Texas Police Department
 Dallas College Police Department (formerly Dallas County Community College District)
 El Paso Community College Police Department
 Houston Baptist University Police Department
 Houston Community College System Police Department
 Howard Payne University Police Department
 Kilgore College Police Department
 Lamar University Police Department
 Laredo Community College Police Department
 Lone Star College System Police Department
 Lubbock Christian University Police Department
 McLennan Community College Police Department
 Midland College Police Department
 Midwestern State University Police Department
 Odessa College Police Department
 Prairie View A&M University Police
 Rice University Police
 Sam Houston State University Police Department  
 San Jacinto College District Police
 Southern Methodist University Police
 Southwestern Christian College (SwCC) Police Department
 
 Stephen F. Austin State University Police Department
 St. Edward's University Police Department
 St. Mary's University Police Department
 Tarrant County College District Police Department
 Texas A&M University Police Department 
 Texas A&M University Corpus Christi Police Department
 Texas A&M University Forest Service Law Enforcement
 Texas A&M University San Antonio Police Department
 Texas Christian University Police Department
 Texas Lutheran University Police Department 
 Texas Southern University Police Department
 Texas State University–San Marcos Police Department
 Texas State Technical College Police Department
 Texas Tech University Police Department
 Texas Women's University Police Department
 Trinity University Police Department 
 Trinity Valley Community College Campus Police
 University of Houston Police Department
 University of Houston–Clear Lake Police Department
 University of Houston–Downtown Police Department
 University of Mary Hardin-Baylor Police Department
 University of North Texas Police Department
 University of North Texas Health Science Center Police Department
 University of St. Thomas Police Department- Houston 
 University of Texas at Arlington Police Department
 University of Texas at Austin Police Department
 University of Texas at Dallas Police Department
 University of Texas at El Paso Police Department
 University of Texas at Houston Police Department
 University of Texas Rio Grande Valley 
 University of Texas at San Antonio Police Department
 University of Texas of the Permian Basin Police Department
 University of Texas at Tyler Police Department
 University of Texas Medical Branch Police Department
 University of Texas Health Science Center at San Antonio Police Department
 University of Texas Southwestern Medical Center at Dallas Police Department
 Vernon College Police Department
 University of the Incarnate Word Police Department
 Wayland Baptist University Police Department
 Weatherford College Police Department
 West Texas A&M University Police Department

Independent school district agencies (K–12) 

 Aldine Independent School District Police
 Aledo Independent School District Police
 Alief Independent School District Police
 Alvin Independent School District Police
 Amarillo Independent School District Police
 Angleton Independent School District Police
 Anna Independent School District Police
 Aransas County Independent School District Police 
 Aubrey Independent School District Police
 Austin Independent School District Police
 Barber's Hill Independent School District Police
 Bastrop Independent School District Police
 Bay City Independent School District Police
 Beaumont Independent School District Police
 Beeville Independent School District Police
 Blooming Grove Independent School District Police
 Boerne Independent School District Police 
 Brazosport Independent School District Police
 Bridge City Independent School District Police
 Brownsboro Independent School District Police
 Brownsville Independent School District Police
 Canutillo Independent School District Police
 Carrizo Springs Independent School District Police
 Cedar Hill Independent School District Police
 Castleberry Independent School District Police
 Center Independent School District Police
 Center Point Independent School District Police
 Central Independent School District Police
 China Spring Independent School District Police
 Cleveland Independent School District Police
 Coldspring-Oakhurst independent School District Police
 Conroe Independent School District Police
 Comal Independent School District Police
 Corpus Christi Independent School District Police
 Corsicana Independent School District Police
 Cypress-Fairbanks Independent School District Police
 Daingerfield-Lone Star Independent School District Police
 Dallas Independent School District Police
 Del Valle Independent School District Police
 Dumas Independent School District Police
 Duncanville Independent School District Police
 Eagle Pass Independent School District Police
 East Central Independent School District Police
 Ector County Independent School District Police
 Edinburg Consolidated Independent School District Police
 Edgewood Independent School District Police
 El Paso Independent School District Police
 Ennis Independent School District Police
 Eustace Independent School District Police
 Farmersville Independent School District Police
 Ferris Independent School District Police
 Floresville Independent School District Police
 Fort Bend Independent School District Police
 Fort Sam Houston Independent School District Police
 Frenship Independent School District Police
 Galveston Independent School District Police
 Goose Creek Consolidated Independent School District Police
 Gunter Independent School District Police
 Hallsville Independent School District Police
 Harlandale Independent School District Police
 Hempstead Independent School District Police
 Highland Park Independent School District Police (Amarillo, TX)
 Highland Park Independent School District Police (Dallas, TX)
 Houston Independent School District Police
 Humble Independent School District Police
 Hutto Independent School District Police
 Jacksonville Independent School District Police
 Jefferson Independent School District Police
 Judson Independent School District Police
 Katy Independent School District Police
 Kaufman Independent School District Police
 Keene Independent School District Police
 Kemp Independent School District Police
 Killeen Independent School District Police
 Klein Independent School District Police
 La Joya Independent School District Police
 La Vega Independent School District Police
 Lake Travis Independent School District Police
Lamar Consolidated Independent School District Police Department
 Lancaster Independent School District Police
 Laredo Independent School District Police 
 Lindale Independent School District Police
 Linden-Kildare Consolidated Independent School District Police
 London Independent School District Police
 Lubbock Independent School District Police
 Lubbock-Cooper Independent School District Police
 Lyford Consolidated Independent School District Police
 Mabank Independent School District Police
 Madisonville Consolidated Independent School District Police
 Manor Independent School District Police
 Mansfield Independent School District Police
 McAllen Independent School District Police
 Medina Independent School District Police
 Melissa Independent School District Police
 Mexia Independent School District Police
 Midland Independent School District Police
 Nacogdoches Independent School District Police
 Needville Independent School District Police
 Normangee Independent School District Police 
 North East Independent School District Police
 Northside Independent School District Police
 Pasadena Independent School District Police
 Pflugerville Independent School District Police
 Pittsburg Independent School District Police
 Pleasanton Independent School District Police
 Poteet Independent School District Police
 Presidio Independent School District Police
 Quinlan Independent School District Police
 Raymondville Independent School District Police
 Red Oak Independent School District Police
 Rice Independent School District Police
 Roma Independent School District Police
 Round Rock Independent School District Police
 Royal Independent School District Police
 Saltillo Independent School District Police
 Santa Fe Independent School District Police
 Santa Maria Independent School District Police
 Santa Rosa Independent School District Police
 San Antonio Independent School District Police
 San Benito Consolidated Independent School District Police
 Shallowater Independent School District Police
 Silsbee Independent School District Police
 Socorro Independent School District Police
 Somerset Independent School District Police
 South San Antonio Independent School District Police
 Southside Independent School District Police
 Southwest Independent School District Police
 Splendora Independent School District Police 
 Spring Branch Independent School District Police
 Spring Independent School District Police
 Taft Independent School District Police
 Texarkana Independent School District Police
 Tyler Independent School District Police
 United Independent School District Police
 Uvalde Consolidated Independent School District Police
 Vidor Independent School District Police
 Waco Independent School District Police
 Warren Independent School District Police 
 Waskom Independent School District Police
 West Independent School District Police 
 West Rusk County Consolidated Independent School District Police 
 Wharton Independent School District Police 
 White Settlement Independent School District Police 
 Yantis Independent School District Police 
 Zavalla Independent School District Police
 Zapata County Independent School District Police

Other agencies

Airport agencies
 Amarillo Airport Police
 Corpus Christi International Airport Public Safety Department
 DFW International Airport Department of Public Safety
 Laredo International Airport Police
 Lubbock Airport Police
 San Angelo Regional Airport Police
 San Antonio Airport Police

Charter school agencies
 A+ Charter Schools Police

Hospital agencies
 Baylor Scott & White Health Police
 Bexar County Hospital District Police
 Dallas County Hospital District Police
 Ector County Hospital District Police
 Methodist Health System Police
 Tarrant County Hospital District Police
 Texas Health Presbyterian Hospital Police
 Texas Medical Center Police

Park, river authority, and water district agencies
 Brazos River Authority Police
 Denton County Water District Police Department
 Lower Colorado River Authority Police
 San Antonio Park Police
 Tarrant Regional Water District Police
 Travis County Park Police

Port agencies
 Port of Beaumont Police
 Port of Brownsville Police
 Port of Corpus Christi Police
 Port of Galveston Police
 Port of Houston Authority Police

Railroad agencies
 Burlington Northern Santa Fe Railroad Police
 Port Terminal Railroad Association Police
 Union Pacific Railroad Police Department

Transit authority agencies
 Capital Metropolitan Transportation Authority Police Department
 Dallas Area Rapid Transit (DART) Police
 Houston Metro Transit Authority Police
 VIA Metropolitan Transit Police (San Antonio)

References

Texas
Law enforcement agencies of Texas
Law enforcement agencies